Wenshan District is a district in Taipei, Taiwan. It is the southernmost district of the twelve districts in Taipei. Wenshan previously referred to the region south of the Taipei Basin (including Xindian and Pinglin).

History
In 1894 (late Qing era), the local gentry changed the name from "Fist Mountain" to the more elegant "Fort Wenshan" (from ). It included modern Wenshan district as well as Xindian, Shenkeng, Shiding, Pinglin, and Wulai.

Republic of China
After the handover of Taiwan from Japan to the Republic of China in 1945, the government divided the region into three areas, which are Jingmei, Muzha and Shenkeng on 1 March 1950. On 1 July 1968, Jingmei and Muzha townships were reassigned to Taipei City from Taipei County and later combined to become Wenshan District on 12 March 1990.

Culture 
Notable attractions in this district include the Zhinan Temple, Taipei Zoo, Maokong, Jingmei Night Market, Xianji Rock and Fudekeng Environmental Restoration Park. The Examination Yuan and the National Chengchi University are also Daan is better served by the Taipei Metro, The Wenshan Line, Maokong Gondola and Xindian Line in this district. ten stations of which are located in the city: Xinhai, Wanfang Hospital, Wanfang Community, Muzha, Taipei Zoo, Taipei Zoo South, Zhinan Temple Station, Maokong, Wanlong and Jingmei

Although Wenshan is in Taipei city, it seems rather remote at first sight; surrounded by mountains, many people find it is a good place to escape downtown Taipei. On weekends, many people drive to Maokong to enjoy one of the area's numerous teahouses and to breathe the fresh air.

The mountains in Wenshan are ideal for people to exercise on the hiking trails. The Taipei Zoo, which houses two pandas on loan from China, is often jammed by adults and children alike, especially during summer vacation. After the construction of the MRT, it became easier to travel to Wenshan from other districts. Wenshan District also contains the city mayor's residence.

Government institutions
 Coast Guard Administration
 Examination Yuan

Education 
 National Chengchi University
 Taiwan Police College

Infrastructures
 Muzha Refuse Incineration Plant

Transportation 
The district is served by the following stations of the Taipei Metro:
Taipei Zoo station
Muzha metro station
Wanfang Community metro station
Wanfang Hospital metro station
Xinhai metro station
Jingmei metro station
Wanlong metro station

Additionally, the following may also be reached from Wenshan District:
 Maokong Gondola
 Formosa Freeway, Nat'l Hwy no.3
 Muzha Interchange at 20 km
 Taipei connection line
  (3)
  (5)
 Tai 9 line (Beixin Road), County Road 106 (Muzha Road)
 Xinyi Expressway

See also
 District (Taiwan)

References

External links

 
  

Districts of Taipei
1990 establishments in Taiwan
Populated places established in 1990